Daniela Carpio, better known by her stage name Di WAV, is a Guatemalan-Swiss singer-songwriter, musician, visual artist, director and producer. A Latin Alternative act, her music has emerged as a fusion of indie pop, rock, electronic and experimental music. Di WAV sings both in English and Spanish.

Early life 
Daniela Carpio Fischer is the daughter of Karen Fischer and Rodrigo Carpio. At the age of 14, she wrote her first song and incurred into acting and modeling. In 2003, she moved to Panama City, Panama, where she enrolled in College and continued her music studies acquiring knowledge in the production and direction field. In 2007 she received a bachelor's degree in Communications from Universidad Católica Santa María La Antigua, and moved back to Guatemala. She started singing professionally in 2008.

Career

Television
On the year 2006, Carpio debuted as a host on the TV show Solo Caballos, aired by Medcom Network. She worked on the show for two seasons.

In 2011, she lands the role as Pepsi image for the "Pepsi Music" media campaign in Guatemala, and works as a host on the TV Program Pepsi Music Challenge TV, along with Venezuelan presenter Nelson Bustamante. The show was aired by Albavision.

She later joined the TV Azteca Guatemala team in 2014, as a host on the TV Programs "Ventaneando Aca" and "Academia Kids" (Transmission).

Digital Media
On 2015, Carpio moves to the United States searching for bigger career opportunities. She lands a job as a producer / host on Spanish Broadcasting System's digital app LaMusica.  She produced and hosted the shows 
"Alterlatino" and "#TBT" for two seasons.

Music

2008–2011: Career beginnings and S.U.P.E.R. (Sexy, urban, Pop, Electro, Retro) 
In 2008 she met Eduardo Santella, DJ,  producer and engineer, with whom she recorded the song “Tell Me". She later records four more singles in the electronic genre, working with Santella and other Dj´s. On November 26, 2010, she releases her debut album S.U.P.E.R (Sexy, Urban, Pop, Electro, Retro), influenced by pop, urban and retro sounds. Later that year, MTV LATIN AMERICA Network, chooses her song "S.U.P.E.R." to be a part of the official soundtrack of their new original series Popland.

2012–2015: El Mundo Me Hizo Así 
In 2012 she started working on her second album, produced by Juan Luis Lopera, Rudy Bethancourt and Santiago Carvajal (Fainal). Her first single "Lejos" is released in 2013, and reaches No. 1 for several weeks on the Guatemalan music charts. This single is chosen to be a part of the official soundtrack of MTV Latinoamerica new original series Niñas Mal 2. In 2014 she collaborates with the Colombian group Alkilados on the song "Corazón Quebrado", obtaining international success. On June 22, 2015, she releases her second album El Mundo Me Hizo Así.

2018: Di WAV 
In 2018, after a two-year break from music, Carpio met Latin Grammy nominated producer/songwriter Marthin Chan with whom she worked on her third album under the label Afonico Music. The album's first single "Dominos" was announced to be released in September 2018 with a new artistic identity: Di WAV.

On December 6, 2019, she releases her conceptual EP "Masoquista" under the label Afonico Music, which contains 6 tracks. Her song "Vampira en La Luz" is chosen as part of Billboard's playlist "Viva Friday", a compilation of the best Latin songs chosen by the curators of Billboard Latin. "Masoquista" landed #18 of 2019's most streamed Guatemalan albums on Spotify.

2020 - 2021: "Despierta: Visual Album" 
Di WAV's  EP "Despierta" was released on February 4, 2021. The four track album was produced by Grammy winner Reuven Amiel and Latin Grammy nominee Marthin Chan, during the 2020 pandemic.

The first single of "Despierta", "Mente Criminal", charted No.4 in the Guatemalan national charts for several weeks. (Monitor Latino) The album also includes a cover of "Precious" originally performed by British band Depeche Mode.

A short film/ visual of the album titled "Despierta: Pensamientos de Cuarentena", was written and directed by Di WAV herself and released on May 21, 2021 winning critical praise.

Discography

Albums 

 ELECTRO RETRO (2022)
 Despierta (2021)
 Masoquista (2019)
 El Mundo Me Hizo Así. (2015)
 S.U.P.E.R. (2010)

Singles 
 Ataúd (2022)
 333 (2022)
 Zodiaco (2021)
 Precious (2021)
 Cristales de Hielo (2020)
 Ellos Ft. Linxes (2020)
 Mente Criminal (2020)
 El Otro Lado Del Cielo (2019)
 Sal (2019)
 Te Quiero Dar (2019)
 No Volveré a Caer (2018)
 Dominos (2018)
 La Vida No Es La Misma (2015)
 Contigo Quiero Estar (2015)
 Corazon Quebrado ft. Alkilados (2014)
 Que No Pare La Fiesta (2014)
 Pierdo La Razón (2014)
 Me Fui (2013)
 Lejos (2013)
 ¿Donde Está? Ft. Ignacio Borrel (2012)
 No te Conozco (2011)
 Back to Roots (2010)
 "Timbaolize Ft. Ronxxx" (2010)

Collaborations 
 "El Color de tu Voz" Ft. Kronovox (2020)
 Corazon Quebrado ft. Alkilados (2014)
 "Timbaolize Ft. Ronxxx" (2010)
 "Closer to Me Ft. DJ Ronxxx & Boggian" (2010)
 "Give Away Ft. DJ Ronxxx" (2010)
 "So Sexy Ft. Santiago Niño & DJ Ronxxx" (2008)
 "Tell Me Ft. Santiago Niño & DJ Ronxxx" (2008)

Awards and nominations
Premios 40 Principales

References

External links

 Página oficial de Di WAV
 Di WAV on Instagram
 Di WAV on Facebook
 Di WAV on YouTube
 Official MERCH

Guatemalan women singer-songwriters
Living people
People from Guatemala City
21st-century women singers
Swiss singer-songwriters
Latin alternative
Year of birth missing (living people)